List of Melrose Place episodes may refer to:

 List of Melrose Place (1992) episodes, for the original FOX  series
 List of Melrose Place (2009) episodes, for The CW series